Montrose Bay High School is a government co-educational comprehensive secondary school with campuses located in  and , northern suburbs of Hobart, Tasmania, Australia. Established in 2010, the school caters for approximately 700 students from Years 7 to 10. The school is administered by the Tasmanian Department of Education.

In 2019 student enrolments were 625. The school principal is Pieta Langham-McKay.

Montrose Bay High was formed in 2010 through a merger of Rosetta High School and Claremont High School.

See also 
 List of schools in Tasmania
 Education in Tasmania

References

External links
 Montrose Bay High School website

Public high schools in Hobart
Educational institutions established in 2010
2010 establishments in Australia